Dževad Turković (born 17 June 1972) is a former Croatian football player. He capped 6 times for Croatia. He was champion of the Prva HNL in 1993, 1996 and 1997.

Club career
Turković played domestically for Dinamo Zagreb and Osijek and for South Korean clubs Daewoo Royals / Pusan i.cons and Seongnam Ilhwa Chunma.

International career
He made his debut for Croatia in a May 1994 friendly match away against Hungary, coming on as a 46th-minute substitute for Igor Cvitanović, and earned a total of 6 caps, scoring no goals. His final international was a September 1995 European Championship qualification match against Estonia.

References

External links
 

1972 births
Living people
Footballers from Podgorica
Bosniaks of Croatia
Bosniaks of Montenegro
Association football midfielders
Yugoslav footballers
Croatian footballers
Croatia international footballers
GNK Dinamo Zagreb players
Busan IPark players
Seongnam FC players
NK Osijek players
Yugoslav First League players
Croatian Football League players
K League 1 players
Croatian expatriate footballers
Expatriate footballers in South Korea
Croatian expatriate sportspeople in South Korea